Jisshu Sengupta is an Indian actor, producer, television presenter and anchor who predominantly works in Bengali cinema, in addition to few Hindi and Telugu language films. Sengupta made his debut through a Bengali TV series, Mahaprabhu where he portrayed the role of Chaitanya Mahaprabhu; the role gained him much recognition. Subsequently, he made his film debut with Priyojon (1999), which became a debacle at the box office. In 2002, he played Tagore in Sukanta Roy's ambitious venture Chelebela alongside Debashree Roy playing Kadambari Devi. following which he appeared in a spate of critically and commercially unsuccessful projects. He made his Bollywood debut with Shyam Benegal's National Award winning film Netaji Subhas Chandra Bose: The Forgotten Hero (2004). A turning point came in his career when he collaborated with Rituparno Ghosh for the latter's Abohomaan, which earned him critical acclaim. His subsequent collaborations with Ghosh for films which include Noukadubi and Shob Charitro Kalponik brought him a higher degree of critical and commercial success. Sengupta's collaborations with other directors for films such as Jaatishwar, Ek Je Chhilo Raja, Posto enabled him to become one of the most sought out actors in Bengali cinema.

Sengupta continued to garner wider attention and further critical acclaim for the role of a contract killer in Rajkahini (2015) and a private detective in Byomkesh O Chiriyakhana (2016). His biggest commercial success came with the action drama film Zulfiqar (2016), as he continued to draw praise for his performances in Sesh Bole Kichu Nei (2014), Jaatishwar (2014) and Arshinagar (2015)

Apart from films, Sengupta is actively involved in anchoring reality shows and award shows, including Filmfare Awards East (2017). In 2011, he made a comeback on television in the fiction category through Aparajito, which he produced for Star Jalsha.

Films

Television 
 Mahaprabhu
 Hiyar Majhe
 Pratibimbo
 Aparajito (2011-2012)
 Horogouri Pice Hotel (Producer)

Web series

References

External links
 Jisshu Sengupta filmography at IMDb

Indian filmographies
Male actor filmographies